Khrystyna Koslovska (Ukrainian: Христина Козловська; born 1 May 1989) is a Ukrainian writer, poet and journalist.

Biography 
She was born in Ivano-Frankivsk Oblast, Ukraine on May 1, 1989.
After leaving general secondary school in her native village, she studied English philology at the National Precarpathian Vasyl Stefanyk University in Ivano-Frankivsk.

Creative work 
Since 2008 she has been a member of the literary studio "Nobel" (Ivano-Frankivsk) headed by Halyna Petrosanyak; participant in the collection of works "Give! Nobel Prize for Ukrainian Writers! ".
Her works have been published in Ukrainian magazines ("Svit molodi", "Bukovynskyj zhurnal", "Pereval", "Literatura i zhyttia", "Halytskyi korespondent"), as well as in the newspaper of the Ukrainians of the North America - "Ukrainske Slovo".
She is the author of the prose books "More Valuable than Gold" (Publisher "Discursus", Brusturiv, 2015 ), "A Lizard and Its Tail" (Publisher "Discursus", Brusturiv, 2018), a co-author of the book "Expecting. The Nine Peculiar Months" (Publisher "Discursus", Brusturiv, 2018)  and the author of the poetry book "To Touch Spring" (Kolomyia, 2008). Some critics define Khrystyna Kozlovska's stories as existential absurdist prose 
Khrystyna Kozlovska's works were translated into Esperanto, German, Turkish, Dutch, Slovak, Korean, English and French. Some works have been translated into Esperanto by Petro Palyvoda and published in Ukraine ("Ukraina Stelo", US-3-2016-net.pdf), in China ("Penseo", PEN296.pdf, PEN297.pdf, PEN309.pdf), in Canada ("La Riverego"), in the United States («Saluton!», «Beletra Almanako»), in Turkey («Turka Stelo»), in Poland ("Pola Esperantisto"), in Croatia ("Kresko"), in Korea ("TERanidO", in Hungary ("Vesperto. Literaturaj folioj") and in Czech Republic ("Esperanta ligilo", Braille). Some works have been translated by Petro Palyvoda into German and published in "Sklianka Chasu - Zeitglas" and "Aus 20 Jahren Zeitglas". One tale has been translated by Vasil Kadifeli into Turkish and published in "Kurşun Kalem" (Turkey). One story has been translated by Rien Hamers into Dutch and published in "Tijdschrift voor Slavische Literatur" (Netherlands). One story has been translated into Slovak and published in the Anthology of the Ukrainian Prose (Slovakia). In 2022, Zindale Publishing House (Seoul, Republic of Korea) published a book of selected prose by Khrystyna Kozlovska entitled "Cat Flower" in three languages simultaneously: Korean (translated by Ombro-Jang), Esperanto (translated by Petro Palyvoda) and English (translated by Petro Palyvoda), as well as the second edition of this book under the title "A magician". Khrystyna Kozlovska's poems were published in Turkish and French in the Turkish magazine "Le Dactylo Méditerranéen".

Prizes 
Khrystyna Kozlovska is the winner of the poetic contest "From Autumn's Point of View" (Ivano-Frankivsk, 2011), the winner of the literary prize of the publishing house "Smoloskyp" (Ukraine) in 2014, and a laureate of that contest in 2021, a winner of the International Ukrainian-German Oles Honchar Prize for Literature., the winner of the International youth literary contest "Hranoslov-2020".

References

External links 
 Zugetextet.com, Interview with Khrystyna Kozlovska 
 Тиждень.UA, «Малий флот» української прози – (Ukrainian) "Small Fleet" of Ukrainian Prose
 Письменниця Христина Козловська у програмі «Літературна світлиця» на Івано-Франківському телебаченні – (Ukrainian) Writer Khrystyna Kozlovska on Ivano-Frankivsk TV
 День, «Коштовніше за золото», Христина Козловська – (Ukrainian) Article in "Den" about "More Valuable than Gold' by Khrystyna Kozlovska
 Читомо, 9 нещодавно прочитаних книжок від Богдани Матіяш – (Ukrainian) 9 Books read newly by B. Matiiash
 Письменниця з Прикарпаття Христина Козловська стала лауреатом україно-німецької літературної премії імені Олеся Гончара - (Ukrainian) Khrystyna Kozlovska has become the winner of the International Ukrainian-German Oles Honchar Prize for Literature
 Книгу Христини Козловської «Коштовніше за золото» презентували у Чернівцях – (Ukrainian) Book Launching in Chernivtsi
 Христина Козловська, авторка у «Галицькому кореспонденті» (Ukrainian) Khrystyna Kozlovska, Author at GK
 Грані-Т, Про легкість та обтічність форми - (Ukrainian) About Light and Streamlined Form
 LB.ua, Портрети і есенції: Література на літо - (Ukrainian) Portraits and Essences: Literature for Summer
 Видавництво "Дискурсус" - (Ukrainian) Publisher Discursus
 ТРК Карпати, Нова Кома з Христиною Козловською - (Ukrainian) TRC Karpaty, New Comma with Khrystyna Kozlovska
 НТК, У Коломиї студенти поспілкувалися з письменницею Христиною Козловською - (Ukrainian) NTC, In Kolomyia Students Have Communicated with the Writer Khrystyna Kozlovska

Ukrainian writers
21st-century Ukrainian poets
Ukrainian journalists
1989 births
Ukrainian women poets
Living people
21st-century Ukrainian women writers